Hedwig Pauly-Winterstein (1866–1965) was a German stage and film actress.

Selected filmography
 The Clan (1920)
 Anna Boleyn (1920)
 President Barrada (1920)
 Lady Godiva (1921)
 The Inheritance (1922)
 Tragedy of Love (1923)
 The Countess of Paris (1923)
 Alles für Geld (1923)
 The Little Duke (1924)
 Bismarck (1925)
 Countess Maritza (1925)
 State Attorney Jordan (1926)
 The Master of Death (1926)
 Professor Imhof  (1926)
 The Mistress (1927)
 Ludwig II, King of Bavaria (1929)

Bibliography
 Jung, Uli & Schatzberg, Walter. Beyond Caligari: The Films of Robert Wiene. Berghahn Books, 1999.

External links

1866 births
1965 deaths
German stage actresses
German film actresses
German silent film actresses
Actors from Wrocław
19th-century German actresses
20th-century German actresses
People from the Province of Silesia